The U.S. Rubber Manufacturers Association (RMA), established in 1915 as the Rubber Club of America, is a national trade and advocacy group of U.S. rubber tire manufacturers. The Rubber Manufacturers Association formed the Tire Industry Safety Council trade association in the United States in May 1969, which is based in Washington, D.C.

In 2015, government relations expert Anne Forristall Luke was nominated President and CEO of the RMA.

Members
Members of the Rubber Manufacturers Association include:
Bridgestone Americas, Inc.
Continental Tire the Americas, LLC
Cooper Tire & Rubber Company
Kumho Tire U.S.A., Inc.
Goodyear Tire & Rubber Company
Michelin North America, Inc.
Pirelli Tire North America
Sumitomo Rubber North America, Inc.
Toyo Tire Holdings of Americas Inc.
Yokohama Tire Corporation.

British Rubber Manufacturers' Association
The British Rubber Manufacturers' Association is another trade group that "represents the rubber manufacturing industry in the United Kingdom." It is based in London, England.

See also
ETRMA

References

Further reading
 
 
 
 
 
  
 

1915 establishments in the United States
Motor trade associations
Tire industry
Trade associations based in the United States